Legacy is the debut album from underground hip hop artist Akir. It was released on March 20, 2006 on Viper Records. Guest performers on the album include Immortal Technique and Jean Grae. Producers include SouthPaw, Akir, and Apex, and the album was executive produced by Immortal Technique. "Politricks" was released as a single on July 22, 2005.

Track listing

2006 albums
East Coast hip hop albums